Scytalopteryx is a monotypic moth genus belonging to the subfamily Drepaninae first described by Ritsema in 1889. It contains the species Scytalopteryx elongata, described by Snellen in 1889, which is found in Sundaland.

The larvae feed on Cocos, Elaeis, Coffea and Lablab species.

References

Drepaninae
Monotypic moth genera
Drepanidae genera